Srikanter Will is a 1979 Bengali film directed by Dinen Gupta. the film released  under the banner of Jaganmata Films and its music was composed by Salil Chowdhury. The film starred Uttam Kumar, Sumitra Mukherjee and Ranjit Mallick in lead roles.

Cast 
 Geeta Dey
 Uttam Kumar 
 Ranjit Mallick
 Sumitra Mukherjee
 Bikash Ray

Soundtrack

References

External links 
 

1979 films
Bengali-language Indian films
1970s Bengali-language films